Shouyang County is a county in the east-central part of Shanxi province, China. It is under the administration of Jinzhong city.-

Climate

References

www.xzqh.org 

 
County-level divisions of Shanxi
Jinzhong